Varsity Bus Company is a former school bus operator in New York City. This company was established in 2003 when it acquired some of the school bus routes that had been operated by Varsity Transit, a sister company that had operated from 1965 to 2003. Varsity ceased operations by the 2010s, and the headquarters of Varsity were later used by Total Transportation and L&M Bus Corp.

From 1979 until 2005, Varsity Transit affiliate Command Bus Company operated two local and seven express transit bus routes, routes that are now operated by MTA Bus Company. Varsity Transit and Command Bus Company were 40-percent owned by Green Bus Lines, 40-percent owned by Triboro Coach, and 20-percent owned by Jamaica Central Railways. Varsity Bus Company is owned by former executives of Green Bus Lines.

Command Bus

Command Bus traces its history to Pioneer Bus Corporation, established in 1954 by three small school bus and charter bus operators. Until 1960, when it obtained a franchise for the current B100, it only operated school, charter, and racetrack buses. Several express buses were implemented in 1972. Command Bus Company was incorporated October 22, 1979  by the late Mr. William Cooper (1895-1985) to resume bus service following a long strike at Pioneer, which went out of the express and local bus business when the strike started.

Like its corporate owners Green Bus Lines, Triboro Coach, and Jamaica Central Railways, the late Mr. Jerome Cooper (1928-2015) was the chairman of the board of both Varsity Transit and Command Bus Company. Originally co-housed with Varsity Transit, the operations of Command were eventually moved into a new NYCDOT facility at Spring Creek Depot, 12755 Flatlands Avenue in Brooklyn (this garage was leased by MTA Bus following the transfer of Command Bus Company routes to MTA Bus in 2005), it was previously built and owned by the New York City Department of Transportation before being sold to MTA Bus in early 2009).

In 1988, two Command buses were fitted by the Brooklyn Union Gas Company with engines which operated on compressed natural gas (CNG). By the mid-1990s, many of the buses operated by Command ran on CNG.

Bus routes

Command operated the following routes, which after the MTA takeover continued to be operated out of the Spring Creek Bus Depot:

In the mid-1990s, Command operated "Gotham Flyer" service, using unfilled buses to carry express passengers between Midtown and Wall Street.

Fleet

 1986 GM RTS-04/06
 1988-89 MCI Classic TC40-102A
 1994 TMC RTS-06 CNG
 1998 ORION V CNG

References

External links
All Franchise Private Bus Lines Now Operated by MTA

Command Bus Company only.

Bus transportation in New York City
Defunct public transport operators in the United States
American companies established in 1954
Transport companies established in 1954
1954 establishments in New York City
School bus operators